Danaé Blais (born May 10, 1999) is a Canadian short-track speed skater.

Career

Junior
At the 2018 World Junior Short Track Speed Skating Championships, Blais won gold as part of the Canadian 3000 m relay team.

Senior
On January 18, 2022, Blais was named to Canada's 2022 Olympic team.

References

External links

1999 births
Living people
Canadian female speed skaters
Four Continents Short Track Speed Skating Championships medalists
Olympic short track speed skaters of Canada
People from Châteauguay
Short track speed skaters at the 2022 Winter Olympics
21st-century Canadian women